The 2006 Tulane Green Wave football team represented Tulane University in the 2006 NCAA Division I FBS football season. The Green Wave played their home games at the Louisiana Superdome. They competed in the West Division of Conference USA. The team was coached by head coach Chris Scelfo, who was fired after the season.

Schedule

References

Tulane
Tulane Green Wave football seasons
Tulane Green Wave football